Sinjsko Polje is a polje (karstic field) in the inner Dalmatia region of Croatia, the fifth largest in Croatia, covering an area of .

References

Plains of Croatia
Geology of Croatia